Marion is a city in Shawano and Waupaca counties in the U.S. state of Wisconsin. The population was 1,324 at the 2020 census.

History
A post office called Marion has been in operation since 1880. The city was named for Francis Marion, an officer in the American Revolutionary War.

Geography
Marion is located at  (44.672573, -88.886284).

Most of the city lies in Waupaca County, with only a small portion extending into Shawano County.

Demographics

2020 census 
As of the census of 2020, there were 1,324 people residing in the city. 1,310 lived in the Waupaca County portion, and 14 in Shawano County portion.

References

External links
 Official city website
 Sanborn fire insurance maps: 1894 1901 1909

Cities in Wisconsin
Cities in Waupaca County, Wisconsin
Cities in Shawano County, Wisconsin